Guidelines is a 2014 Quebec feature-length documentary by Jean-François Caissy about adolescent students at the École Antoine Bernard high school in the rural community of Carleton-sur-Mer, in the Gaspésie–Îles-de-la-Madeleine region. The film uses a fly on the wall style of documentary storytelling as it chronicles such issues as drug use, bullying and disruptive behaviour, while contrasting school life with the freedom of the outdoors. In conversations between teachers or social workers and students, Caissy often makes use of a fixed camera, so that voices of adult authority are off-screen and unseen.

Caissy has stated that Guidelines is part of a series of films he plans to make on five stages of human life: childhood, adolescence, young adulthood, middle age as well as old age, which was the subject of his 2010 feature documentary La belle visite. Caissy grew up in the Gaspésie region, and was drawn to the Antoine Bernard school because it reminded him of his own experiences as a youth.

The film is produced by the National Film Board of Canada.

Release
Guidelines had its world premiere at the Berlin International Film Festival.

References

External links

2014 films
2014 documentary films
National Film Board of Canada documentaries
Quebec films
Documentary films about adolescence
Documentary films about high school
Carleton-sur-Mer
French-language Canadian films
2010s Canadian films
2010s French-language films